Marko Vujič (born 25 July 2000) is a professional Serbian footballer who currently plays for FC ViOn Zlaté Moravce as a defender.

Club career

FC ViOn Zlaté Moravce
Vujič made his Fortuna Liga debut for ViOn Zlaté Moravce at ViOn Aréna against AS Trenčín on 7 November 2020. Vujič came on in the 84th minute as a replacement for David Hrnčár, with the final score of 5:0 already set, following goals by Hrnčár, Kovaľ and a hat-trick by Balaj.

References

External links
 FC ViOn Zlaté Moravce official club profile 
 
 Futbalnet profile 
 

2000 births
Living people
Place of birth missing (living people)
Serbian footballers
Serbian expatriate footballers
Association football defenders
FK Teleoptik players
FC ViOn Zlaté Moravce players
Serbian League players
Slovak Super Liga players